Reginald Cyril Symes (born 30 April 1943) is a Canadian former politician. He represented the Sault Ste. Marie electoral district in the House of Commons of Canada from 1972 to 1980. He was a member of the New Democratic Party.

Symes was defeated in the 1980 election by Ron Irwin.

Election results

References

External links
 
 Reginal Cyril Symes fonds - Library and Archives Canada

1943 births
Living people
Members of the House of Commons of Canada from Ontario
New Democratic Party MPs
Politicians from Thunder Bay